S*P*Y*S is a 1974 American spy comedy film directed by Irvin Kershner and starring Elliott Gould, Donald Sutherland and Zouzou. The film was screened at the 1974 Cannes Film Festival, but it was not entered into the main competition.

Plot
Following an accident where two KGB agents are mistakenly killed during a failed attempt to help a Russian athlete's defection to the West, the head of CIA in Paris stipulates an agreement with his Russian counterpart to have two American agents killed in order to avoid retaliation. The choice falls on Bruland, an uptight agent passionate about his job and on the promotion ladder, and Griff, a somehow cynical and disillusioned courier. When the two men discover the plot, they form an uneasy alliance to try to escape, eventually getting involved with a French anarchist group and an independent French agent.

Cast
 Elliott Gould as Griff
 Donald Sutherland as Bruland
 Zouzou as Sybil (as Zou Zou)
 Joss Ackland as Martinson
 Xavier Gélin as Paul (Revolutionary)
 Vladek Sheybal as Borisenko (Russian Spy Chief)
 Michael Petrovitch as Sevitsky (Defector)
 Shane Rimmer as Hessler
 Kenneth Griffith as Lippet
 Pierre Oudrey as Revolutionary (as Pierre Oudry)
 Kenneth J. Warren as Grubov
 Jacques Marin as Lafayette
 Jeffrey Wickham as Seely
 Nigel Hawthorne as Croft
 John Bardon as Evans

Production
Filming took place in Paris and England. "Donald and I are very funny together," said Gould. "We're sort of Laurel and Hardy gone straight. Or half straight. And Kershner is very serious. It makes a good balance."

Title
The film was originally called Wet Stuff, after spy slang for blood.

The asterisks in the title are designed to remind viewers of MASH, which also starred Gould and Sutherland, and whose title is generally rendered with the same asterisks. Beyond this, there is no connection between the films.

Reception
Nora Sayre of The New York Times wrote, "The only mystery contained in 'S*P*Y*S'—a feeble attempt to spoof the Central Intelligence Agency is why Donald Sutherland and Elliott Gould ever chose to be in it." Arthur D. Murphy of Variety called the film "a mess ... The script is tasteless, Irvin Kershner's direction is futile, and the whole effort comes across as vulgar, offensive and tawdry." Gene Siskel of the Chicago Tribune gave the film one-and-a-half stars out of four and criticized it for "creaky old jokes," writing that Kershner "plays for laughs as if the world has stood still for 20 years. The film's visual style has the look of a Hope and Crosby 'Road' picture, whereas the pacing and personalities of Sutherland and Gould are strictly contemporary." Charles Champlin of the Los Angeles Times called it "a trivial spy caper comedy ... not without its amusing touches but with almost nothing on its mind." Gary Arnold of The Washington Post wrote, "The material is not in the least fresh. The script sounds as if it had been sitting around gathering dust for several years, and whoever dusted it off failed to inject much in the way of new jokes or verbal wit. However, director Irvin Kershner brings so much energy and professionalism to this essentially tired assignment that it plays with considerable verve."

The film grossed $1,148,674 in its opening weekend from 79 theaters.

Novelization
Shortly before the release of the film, as customary in the era, Pocket Books published a novelization of the screenplay, as by T. Robert Joyce. The by-line seems to exist nowhere else and may be a pseudonym.

See also
 List of American films of 1974

References

External links
 
 
 

1974 films
20th Century Fox films
1970s spy comedy films
1970s action comedy films
American spy comedy films
Cold War spy films
Films directed by Irvin Kershner
Films scored by Jerry Goldsmith
Films produced by Robert Chartoff
Films produced by Irwin Winkler
American action adventure films
American action comedy films
1974 comedy films
1970s English-language films
1970s American films